Kolo is an administrative ward in the Kondoa district of the Dodoma Region of Tanzania.

According to the 2002 census, the ward has a total population of 8,268.

References

Kondoa District
Wards of Dodoma Region